Curiñanco is a coastal village in the Los Ríos Region of Chile belonging to the comuna of Valdivia. It is located on the stretch of coast between the estuary of the Valdivia River and that of the Lingue River. It has a current population of 274 inhabitants according to the 2002 census. Curiñanco can be reached from the south by an asphalt and gravel road originating in the town of Niebla, and from the southeast by another road, primarily gravel, that originates in Torobayo and passes near to Punucapa en route to the coast. Curiñanco takes its name from the cacique Curiñancu, father of the Mapuche leader Lautaro.

Sports 
The village has an amateur football club known as the Curiñanco Sports Club, which was founded December 8, 1918. The club participates in the Niebla Sports League along with other local teams.

Community 
Curiñanco is home to an indigenous community known as the Kiñe Wen Indigenous Community of Curiñanco.

References

Landforms of Los Ríos Region
Beaches of Chile
Populated places in Valdivia Province
Coasts of Los Ríos Region